Ralph Julian Rivers (May 23, 1903 – August 14, 1976) was an American lawyer and Democratic politician who served as the first United States Representative from Alaska, serving from statehood in 1959 to his resignation in 1966 following his defeat by Republican Howard Wallace Pollock. He previously served as the shadow U.S. Representative from Alaska Territory from 1956 to 1959.

Biography
Born in Seattle, Washington to Louisa Zenaide (née Lavoy) and Julian Guy Rivers, Rivers attended grammar school in Flat, Alaska, and Franklin High School in Seattle. He worked as a gold miner in Flat from 1921 to 1923, and then earned an LL.B. from the University of Washington School of Law in 1929. He then worked as a lawyer in private practice for several years.

Rivers was a lifelong civil servant, working in a number of public positions throughout his life. He served as United States Attorney for District of Alaska, from 1933 to 1944. He was then elected as the attorney general of Alaska, serving from 1945 to 1949. He was the chair of the Employment Security Commission of Alaska from 1950 to 1952, and then became the mayor of Fairbanks, Alaska from 1952 to 1954. In 1954 he was also president of the League of Alaskan Cities. He was a member of the Alaska Territorial Senate in 1955, and was the second vice president of the Alaska Constitutional Convention at College, Alaska in 1955 and 1956. He was a delegate to the Democratic National Conventions in 1960, 1964, and 1968.

Rivers appeared on the game show To Tell the Truth as contestant #1 in the second group of contestants on June 2, 1959.

U.S. House of Representatives
In 1957 and 1958, Rivers was a United States Representative-elect under the Alaska-Tennessee Plan in Washington, D.C., on a provisional basis, pending statehood. Upon the admission of Alaska as a State into the Union, he was elected as a Democrat to the Eighty-sixth and to the three succeeding Congresses and served from January 3, 1959 until December 30, 1966. He was an unsuccessful candidate for reelection to the Ninetieth Congress in 1966, resigning days before the end of his term.

Rivers died in Chehalis, Washington, and his remains were cremated. His ashes were interred at Sunset Memorial Gardens.

Electoral history

Alaska's at-large congressional district: Results 1958–1966

References

External links

 
 Ralph Rivers at 100 Years of Alaska's Legislature

|-

|-

1903 births
1976 deaths
20th-century American lawyers
20th-century American politicians
Alaska Attorneys General
American gold prospectors
Delegates to Alaska's Constitutional Convention
Democratic Party members of the United States House of Representatives from Alaska
Franklin High School (Seattle) alumni
Lawyers from Fairbanks, Alaska
Mayors of Fairbanks, Alaska
Members of the Alaska Territorial Legislature
People from Chehalis, Washington
People from Yukon–Koyukuk Census Area, Alaska
Politicians from Seattle
United States Attorneys for the District of Alaska
University of Washington School of Law alumni